is a former Japanese football player. He played for Japan national team.

Club career
Furuta was born in Hiroshima on October 27, 1952. After graduating from Waseda University, he joined his local club Toyo Industries (later Mazda) in 1975. The club won second place at 1978 Emperor's Cup. He retired in 1984.

National team career
On August 13, 1971, when Furuta was a Waseda University student, he debuted for Japan national team against Iceland. It was the youngest player to play for Japan national team at the age of 18 years and 29 days until Daisuke Ichikawa made new record in 1998. He played at 1974 and 1978 Asian Games. He played 32 games for Japan until 1978.

National team statistics

References

External links
 
 Japan National Football Team Database

1952 births
Living people
Waseda University alumni
Association football people from Hiroshima Prefecture
Japanese footballers
Japan international footballers
Japan Soccer League players
Sanfrecce Hiroshima players
Footballers at the 1974 Asian Games
Footballers at the 1978 Asian Games
Association football defenders
Asian Games competitors for Japan